Petrophila schistopalis is a moth in the family Crambidae. It was described by George Hampson in 1906. It is found in Tabasco, Mexico.

References

Petrophila
Moths described in 1906